West Virginia Route 273 is a north–south state highway entirely within Marion County, West Virginia. Known as the Fairmont Gateway Connector, the road provides direct access from Interstate 79 to downtown Fairmont. The road was built as a four-lane divided highway along the former State Street corridor and fully opened to traffic on December 22, 2010.

The southern terminus of the route is at  exit #136 on Interstate 79. Its northern end is at West Virginia Route 310 at the foot of the Robert H. Mollohan-Jefferson Street Bridge, where traffic can continue into downtown Fairmont. The project features controlled-access right-of-way, a steel arch bridge over Interstate 79, and West Virginia's first two roundabouts. It was built at a cost of $150 million.

Major intersections

References

273
Transportation in Marion County, West Virginia